County routes in Tioga County, New York, are signed with the Manual on Uniform Traffic Control Devices-standard yellow-on-blue pentagon shield. Even numbered routes are east–west in direction, while odd numbered routes are north–south. County routes in Tioga County are also assigned section numbers based on town. The second and third digits are the same for each road name on a given route, but the first digit varies by town. Routes in the town of Barton, the first of nine towns alphabetically in Tioga County, have section numbers beginning with "1" while routes in the town of Tioga, the last alphabetically, have section numbers beginning with "9". Routes in the other seven towns—Berkshire, Candor, Newark Valley, Nichols, Owego, Richford, and Spencer—have section numbers beginning with "2" through "8", respectively. The section numbers, listed below as CH #, exist solely for inventory purposes and are not posted.

Route list

See also

County routes in New York
List of former state routes in New York (201–300)

References

External links
Empire State Roads – Tioga County Roads